Terrappee is a town in the local government areas of the Shire of Buloke and the Shire of Loddon, Victoria, Australia which is possibly named after the lake in the area. The post office there opened as Terrapee  on 13 October 1887 and was closed on 1 December 1927.

References